Stanytsia-Luhanska Raion was a raion (district) in Luhansk Oblast of eastern Ukraine. The administrative center of the raion was the urban-type settlement of Stanytsia Luhanska. The raion was abolished on 18 July 2020 as part of the administrative reform of Ukraine, which reduced the number of raions of Luhansk Oblast to eight, of which only four were controlled by the government.

Since 2014 some areas of the raion were not under control of Ukrainian government and have been part of the Luhansk People's Republic They were later absorbed in other administrative units.

Demographics
As of the 2001 Ukrainian Census:

Ethnicity
Russians: 61.1%
Ukrainians: 36.5%
Belarusians: 0.6%

Language
Russian: 85.1%
Ukrainian: 14.2%
Armenian: 0.2%
Belarusian: 0.1%
Romani: 0.1%

References

Former raions of Luhansk Oblast
1923 establishments in Ukraine
Ukrainian raions abolished during the 2020 administrative reform